Rich in Love is a 1992 drama film directed by Bruce Beresford and starring Albert Finney, Kathryn Erbe, Kyle MacLachlan, Jill Clayburgh, Suzy Amis, and Ethan Hawke. It is based on the 1987 novel Rich in Love by Josephine Humphreys.

Plot
The Odom family lives in a large, white, Southern house in Mount Pleasant, South Carolina, just off Pitt Street, looking out onto Charleston Harbor. Lucille Odom (Erbe) is nearing the end of her last year of high school when her mother, Helen Odom (Clayburgh), leaves the family, breaking all ties.  Lucille is left to care for her recently retired father, Warren Odom (Finney).

The family spends the summer trying to get their lives together, which is complicated when the older daughter of the family, Rae (Amis), moves back home with a new husband (MacLachlan) and a baby on the way, about which Rae has mixed feelings.  While reminiscing about their mother, Rae tells Lucille that their mother tried to abort Lucille when she was pregnant. Warren notices his daughters in new and different ways now that his wife is gone and he is no longer working.  Everything changes for Lucille as she comes-of-age and learns about her family in new ways.

Cast

Production
The film was set and produced in Mount Pleasant, South Carolina.  Some additional footage was shot across the Cooper River in Charleston.

Reception
The film received mostly positive reviews. However, one drawback was that many did not find the story believable, as the family's problems and a happy ending were something of a fantasy. For example, Roger Ebert of the Chicago Sun-Times gave the film three stars out of four, writing "I must confess I didn't much believe the story".

Home media
The film was released on DVD via Amazon’s On-Demand service on December 15, 2009.

References

External links

1992 films
1992 drama films
American drama films
Films scored by Georges Delerue
Films based on American novels
Films directed by Bruce Beresford
Films produced by Richard D. Zanuck
Films set in Charleston, South Carolina
Films shot in South Carolina
Metro-Goldwyn-Mayer films
The Zanuck Company films
1990s English-language films
1990s American films